Soleneiscus radovani is a species of calcareous sponge in the family Dendyidae, and was first described in 1999 by Gert Wörheide and John Hooper. The species epithet, radovani, honours Radovan Borojevic for "his substantial and pioneering achievements in calcarean taxonomy".

It is found in Queensland coastal waters, where occurs in waters with surface temperatures of 20 to 30° C.

References

Taxa named by Gert Wörheide
Taxa named by John Hooper (marine biologist)
Clathrinida
Sponges of Australia